"No I in Beer" is a song recorded by American country music artist Brad Paisley. It was released on April 15, 2020 by Arista Nashville. The song was written by Paisley and Kelley Lovelace in 2018, produced by Dann Huff and Luke Wooten.

Background
Paisley mentioned in a statement: "People are utilizing this time to connect and to feel solidarity as human beings," "This song wasn't written for this specific moment we are all facing, but it takes on a new meaning for me when I hear it now."
Paisley said it takes on a new meaning during the COVID-19 pandemic, and continue metioned in a news: "If we've ever felt unified as Americans, as citizens of the world, it's in the fact that nobody loves what we're going through, but everybody's willing to do what we have to do. One of those things is, let's be a team."

Music video
The music video was premiered on July 30, 2020. It included people doing various activities on Zoom calls during the COVID-19 isolation. Paisley invited his friends to participate in the project, also comprised Carrie Underwood, Tim McGraw, Lindsay Ell, Darius Rucker, Brett Kissel, Peyton Manning, and Clayton Kershaw.

The video showed from more than 39 different countries and 225 fans sang and performed the song safely from home, bounced off beer with a basketball and also includes the various Zoom crashes Paisley has done when he’s joined people to celebrate birthdays, cancer free celebrations, happy hours, nurse meetings and other gatherings.

Charts

Weekly charts

Year-end charts

References

2020 singles
2020 songs
Brad Paisley songs
Songs written by Kelley Lovelace
Songs written by Brad Paisley
Song recordings produced by Dann Huff
Arista Nashville singles